Countess Irina Felixovna Sheremeteva (née Princess Yusupova; ; 21 March 1915, Petrograd, Russian Empire – 30 August 1983), known affectionately as Bébé, was a Russian aristocrat and the only daughter of Prince Felix Yusupov and Princess Irina of Russia.

Life

Early life

Prince Felix was the heir of one of the wealthiest families of Russia and of Europe. Princess Irina Alexandrovna of Russia was the daughter of Grand Duke Alexander Mikhailovich and Grand Duchess Xenia Alexandrovna, the elder daughter of Tsar Alexander III and sister of Tsar Nicolas II. Through her mother's side, she was a descendant of Christian IX of Denmark. 

After the February Revolution, the Yusupovs fled Russia and settled in Paris, leaving behind most of their wealth. At first, the little girl was raised by her paternal grandparents until, at the age of nine, they returned the little princess to her parents.  According to her father, Prince Felix Yusupov Feliksovitch, his daughter received a poor education causing an alteration in the character of the girl, who became capricious. Princess Irina Felixovna Yusupova was raised by nannies and, whilst she adored her father, she was very distant with her mother.

Marriage

Princess Irina married on 19 June 1938 in Paris, France, Count Nikolai Dmitrievich Sheremetev (28 October 1904, Moscow, Russia – 5 February 1979, Paris, France), son of Count Dmitri Sergeievich Sheremetev and his wife Countess Irina Ilarionovna Vorontsova-Dashkova. His ancestors include Boris Petrovich Sheremetev and Illarion Ivanovich Vorontsov-Dashkov. He worked with  the shipping company, Vlasoff. He later contracted tuberculosis, and they moved to Greece for a climate better suited to his condition.

They had one daughter, Countess Xenia Nikolaevna Sheremeteva, born 1 March 1942 in Rome.

Death and burial
Princess Irina Felixovna Yusupova died on 30 August 1983 at Cormeilles in France. She was buried alongside her paternal grandparents and her parents at the cemetery  Sainte-Geneviève-des-Bois Russian Cemetery in Essonne, France).

Descendants
Countess Xenia Nikolaevna Sheremeteva (born 1 March 1942, Rome, Italy), married on 20 June 1965 in Athens, Greece, to Ilias Sfiris (born 20 August 1932, Athens, Greece); had issue:
Tatiana Sfiris (born 28 August 1968, Athens, Greece), married in May 1996 in Athens, Greece, to Alexis Giannakoupoulos (born 1963), divorced, no issue; married Anthony Vamvakidis and has issue:
Marilia Vamvakidis (7 July 2004)
Yasmine Xenia Vamvakidis (17 May 2006)

Xenia Sheremeteva provided mitochondrial DNA (mDNA) in the 1990s in order to help identify bones recovered in Siberia in 1979 as the remains of Tsar Nicholas II of Russia, who was executed in 1918 along with his wife and children. The test required a female line descendant, as mDNA is passed unchanged from mother to child, unless there is a mutation. In Sheremeteva's case, mDNA from their shared ancestor, Empress Maria Feodorovna, passed to her great-grandmother, Grand Duchess Xenia of Russia, then to her grandmother,  Princess Irina of Russia, and then to her mother, Princess Irina Yusopova, and finally to her.

Ancestry

Bibliography

References

Countesses of the Russian Empire
1915 births
1983 deaths
Morganatic issue of Romanovs
Irina Yusupova
Emigrants from the Russian Empire to France
House of Romanov in exile
Russian princesses